Uroctonus is a genus of forest scorpions in the family Vaejovidae. There are at least four described species in Uroctonus.

Species
These four species belong to the genus Uroctonus:
 Uroctonus franckei Williams, 1986
 Uroctonus grahami Gertsch & Soleglad, 1972
 Uroctonus mordax Thorell, 1876 (California forest scorpion)
 Uroctonus privus Karsch, 1879

References

Further reading

 

Vaejovidae